Chen Peisi (born 1 February 1954) is a Chinese sketch comedian, film and stage actor, and voice actor.  Chen's oft-time comedy partner is Zhu Shimao.

Name
Chen Peisi is the second son of famous stage and film actor Chen Qiang. Chen Qiang's first son (Chen Peisi's brother) was born in 1951 while he was overseas in the Hungarian capital Budapest performing The White-Haired Girl, so he named his first son Chen Buda after Buda, the western half of Budapest, as he loved the city during the visit.  When the second son was born three years later, he named the son Peisi after Pest, the eastern half of Budapest, as the Standard Chinese phonetic translation of Budapest is "Bù Dá Peì Sī".  Chen Qiang's youngest child and daughter Chen Lida was also named after a part of Budapest — the Margaret Island in the Danube between Buda and Pest.

Biography
Chen was born in Changchun, Jilin on 1 February 1954. In 1966, Chen studied at The High School Affiliated to Beijing Normal University. In 1969, during the Cultural Revolution, he worked in Inner Mongolia Production and Construction Corps. In 1973, Chen worked in August First Film Studio as an actor. In 1991, Chen set up a company named Hainan Comedy Film and Television Limited Company, then renamed it Dadao Film and Television Limited Company. In 2000, Chen and his partner Zhu Shimao sued the China International Television Corporation over royalties from broadcasts which they won, but they were then taken off air by the parent company, China Central Television.

On October 26, 2020, he returned to the CCTV stage and served as the first instructor of the variety show "Gold Medal Comedy Class" after 20 years.

Filmography

Film

Television

Variety show

References

1954 births
Living people
Male actors from Changchun
Chinese male film actors
Chinese male television actors
Chinese male comedians
Chinese male voice actors
Chinese male stage actors